Montreal bus routes operated by the Société de transport de Montréal (STM; Montreal Transit Corporation (MTC)) consist of 220 daytime and 23 night service routes and provide a vast number of routes for the Island of Montreal. STM bus routes served an average of 1,403,700 daily passengers on an average weekday in 2011.

A route is referred to by its route number and name (such as 80 Du Parc). The name of the route is usually named after the road or the community that it primarily serves.
Express routes are usually denoted by a 4 before the number of its local equivalent (such as 480 Express Du Parc). However, there are some exceptions (such as 211 Bord-du-Lac/405 Express Bord-du-Lac), and some express routes (such as 475 Express Dollard-Des-Ormeaux) have no local equivalents.

Routes

Regular routes 
The following is a complete list of all the Daytime Regular, Night Routes, Express Routes, and Senior Shuttles STM bus routes.

Former routes

References

External links 
 STM bus network page  
 Choice of STM Maps

STM bus routes
Montreal MTC
bus routes
Bus routes